SNAP-7941 is a drug used in scientific research, which is a selective, non-peptide antagonist at the melanin concentrating hormone receptor MCH1. In initial animal studies it had promising anxiolytic, antidepressant and anorectic effects, but subsequent trial results were disappointing, and the main significance of SNAP-7941 is as the lead compound from which more potent and selective antagonists such as SNAP-94847 were developed, although it continues to be used for research into the function of the MCH1 receptor.

References

Antidepressants
Anxiolytics
Ethers
Fluoroarenes
Anilides
Pyrimidones
Methyl esters